Nursing is a healthcare profession.

Nursing may also refer to:

 The feeding of mammalian young on milk or milk replacement, such as breastfeeding in humans
 Wet nursing, the act of breastfeeding someone else's child
 Healing, also known as nursing

See also 
 Nurse (disambiguation)
 Nursery (disambiguation)